Breconshire is an alternative name for the Welsh county of Brecknockshire

It may also refer to:

Breconshire (UK Parliament constituency)

Ships
, a fast passenger-cargo ship, built in Hong Kong and lost off Malta in 1942
, a fast passenger-cargo ship, completed as escort carrier  in 1942 and renamed Breconshire in 1946

Other uses
Breconshire Brewery, a former brewery in Brecon, Powys